Pietro Romanèlli (born in Rome, Italy in 1889 – died in Rome, Italy in 1981) was an Italian archaeologist.

Born in Rome, he carried out excavations at Tarquinia, Ostia Antica, the Palatine Hill in Rome, at the Forum Romanum and at Leptis Magna in Libya. Among his students was the Roman archaeologist and researcher at Ostia Antica Maria Floriani Squarciapino (1917-2003).

Necrology
A. M. Colini. "Pietro Romanelli" StRom 30 (1982), 358–65.

Sources
Fabrizio Vistoli, s.v. "Pietro Romanelli", in Dizionario Biografico degli Italiani, vol. 88, Roma, Istituto della Enciclopedia Italiana, 2017, pp. 221–224.

References

1889 births
1981 deaths
Italian archaeologists
20th-century archaeologists